Jeff Tobolski is a former member of the Cook County Board of Commissioners, who represented the 16th district which includes all or parts of the suburbs Franklin Park, Northlake, Stone Park, Melrose Park, Maywood, Hillside, Westchester, Brookfield, North Riverside, Berwyn, Riverside, Cicero, Stickney, Forest View, Lyons, La Grange, Summit, Countryside, McCook, Bedford Park and the Archer Heights neighborhood in the City of Chicago.

Early life
Tobolski was born and raised in McCook, Illinois, where he currently lives with his wife and daughter. He has graduated from both St. Hugh School in Lyons, Illinois and St. Joseph High School in Westchester. He played basketball for head coach Gene Pingatore during his time at St. Joseph. He later earned a bachelor of arts in history at Knox College. Jeff served as a Trustee for the McCook Park District and then as President. He then served as a Village of McCook Trustee for six years, and was appointed interim Mayor of McCook in 2007. In 2009 he was elected Mayor of McCook to a full four year term. Prior to becoming Mayor, he worked as a claim’s adjuster for Fireman's Fund Insurance Company for fifteen years as a claim’s adjuster, including five years investigating insurance fraud in the Special Investigations Unit and as a Field Claims Adjuster for Standard Mutual Insurance Company.

Cook County Commissioner
In the Democratic primary he was endorsed by the Chicago Sun Times and the Chicago Tribune over Bill Russ, the Mayor of Brookfield and Northlake Alderman Eddy Garcia. He won the Democratic nomination with 55% of the vote to his opponents 23% and 22% respectively.

During the election he was endorsed by Chicago Federation of Labor,  Service Employees International Union, Local 73, Chicago Firefighters Union, Local 2, LIUNA, Local 225, the Italian American Political Coalition and the Hispanic Illinois State Law Enforcement Association (HISLEA). Additionally, he received endorsements from numerous other officials in the district including U.S. Representative Dan Lipinski  State Senators Don Harmon, Tony Munoz and Martin Sandoval, State Representatives Elizabeth Hernandez, Karen Yarbrough and Michael Zalewski, President of the Metropolitan Water Reclamation District Terrence J. O'Brien and twelve local mayors. On Election Day, he defeated incumbent Tony Peraica with 50% of the vote to Peraica's 43%.

As a member of the Cook County Board of Commissioners he served as the Chair Homeland Security & Emergency Management Committee and Vice Chair of the Veterans Committee. His other committee assignments were Capital Improvements, Finance - Litigation, Finance - Pension, Finance - Tax Delinquency, Finance - Workers' Compensation, Law Enforcement and Workforce, Job Development & Training Development.
Like all commissioners, he was a member of the board for the Forest Preserve District of Cook County which is responsible for the management of 68,000 acres of forest preserves and is the Chairman of that board's Zoological Committee.

On March 6, 2020, Tobolski turned in his resignation from his Cook County Commissioner role, effective at the end of the month, amid a federal probe. Local Democratic Committeepersons appointed Frank Aguilar, a former Republican member of the Illinois House of Representatives from Cicero to succeed Tobolski.

References

External links
Official Website
Official Campaign Website

1964 births
American people of Italian descent
Illinois Democrats
Knox College (Illinois) alumni
Living people
McCook, Illinois
Members of the Cook County Board of Commissioners
People from Cook County, Illinois